Melchor López (born 7 January 1913, date of death unknown) is an Argentine former sports shooter. He competed at the 1960 Summer Olympics and the 1964 Summer Olympics.

References

1913 births
Year of death missing
Argentine male sport shooters
Olympic shooters of Argentina
Shooters at the 1960 Summer Olympics
Shooters at the 1964 Summer Olympics
Sportspeople from Buenos Aires